The 3rd Annual Nickelodeon Kids' Choice Awards was held on June 25, 1989, at Universal Studios Hollywood. The hosts for the event were Nicole Eggert and Wil Wheaton.

Appearances
 Bobby Heenan
 Danica McKellar
 Jason Hervey
 Chris Young

Performers
 Corey Feldman
 New Kids on the Block

Winners and nominees
Winners are listed first, in bold. Other nominees are in alphabetical order.

Movies

Television

Music

Sports

References

External links
 

Nickelodeon Kids' Choice Awards
Kids' Choice Awards
Kids' Choice Awards
June 1989 events in the United States